Qaradeyin (also, Qaradeyn, Karadein, and Karadigin) is a village and municipality in the Qabala Rayon of Azerbaijan.  It has a population of 375.

References 

Populated places in Qabala District